Rev It Up is the second album by the American hard rock band Vixen, released by EMI in 1990. It entered the UK Albums Chart at No. 20, and placed two songs inside the Billboard Hot 100. However, it did not match up to its predecessor in the US and EMI dropped the band shortly thereafter. Therefore, this album is the band's last release from a major label. The race car on the US cover belonged to local racing legend and all around hero Bobby Baldwin. The European and Japanese covers show a picture of the band, which is on the back cover for the US release. 
A remastered version was released on CD by Rock Candy Records in February 2023

Reception

Rev It Up received generally mixed reviews from critics, including a score of 3 out of 5 from AllMusic.

Track listing

Personnel
Vixen
Janet Gardner – lead vocals, rhythm guitar
Jan Kuehnemund – lead guitar, backing vocals
Share Pedersen – bass, backing vocals
Roxy Petrucci – drums, backing vocals

Additional musicians
Michael Alemania – keyboards

Production
Randy Nicklaus - producer
Dennis MacKay - engineer
Chad Blinman, Chris Fuhrman, Mike Gunderson, Gina Immel, Rob Jacobs, Bill Kennedy, Chad Munsey - assistant engineers
Mike Shipley - mixing
George Marino - mastering at Sterling Sound, New York
Mark Sullivan - production coordinator
David Reilly - sound technician for Jan Kuehnemund's guitar
Jack Benson - second engineer

Charts

References

Vixen (band) albums
1990 albums
EMI Records albums